Oranienburg Palace is a Schloss located in the town of Oranienburg in Germany. It is the oldest Baroque Schloss in the Margraviate of Brandenburg and built in a Dutch style.

External links
 Oranienburg Palace Museum - official site

Baroque architecture in Brandenburg
Castles in Brandenburg
Museums in Brandenburg
Art museums and galleries in Germany
Buildings and structures in Oberhavel
Royal residences in Brandenburg